This is a list of records and statistics for Coventry City F.C., an English professional association football club based in Coventry. The club was founded as Singers F.C. in 1883 and turned professional in 1893, before joining the Football League in 1920. In 1898 the club was renamed Coventry City. Coventry City currently play in the EFL Championship, the second tier of English football. They were relegated out of the top tier for the first time in 34 years in 2001.

This list encompasses the major honours won by Coventry City and records set by the club, their managers and their players. The player records section includes details of the club's leading goalscorers and those who have made most appearances in first-team competitions. It also records notable achievements by Coventry City players on the international stage, and the highest transfer fees paid and received by the club. The club's attendance records, both at Ricoh Arena, their home since 2005, and Highfield Road, their home from 1899 to 2005, are also included in the list.

Team records

Record wins and defeats

League sequences

Wins, draws and defeats

* Season concluded with 10 games remaining due to the COVID-19 pandemic.

Points

Attendances

Club honours
Correct as of June 2020.

All-time FA Premier League table

Correct as of the end of the 2019–20 Premier League season.

Teams in bold are part of the 2020–21 Premier League. 47 teams have played at least one season in the Premier League, since it formed for the 1992–93 season. Coventry City were in this league from 1992 until their relegation in 2001.

Player records

Appearances

Most appearances (all competitions)
Correct as of match on 4 March 2023.

Goals

Most goals (all competitions)
Correct as of match on 18 March 2023.

Internationals

Transfers in
Correct as of June 2020.
Highest transfer fees paid
Coventry City's record signing is Craig Bellamy, who signed for the club from Norwich City for £6.5 million in August 2000. This beat the previous record of £6 million, which the club paid Wolverhampton Wanderers for Robbie Keane in 1999, which made Keane the most expensive teenager in British football.

Progression of record fee paid

Transfers out
Correct as of June 2020.
Highest transfer fees received
The club's record sale came in August 2000, when they sold Robbie Keane to Inter Milan for £13 million. The sale of Chris Kirkland to Liverpool for £6 million in 2001 set a British record transfer fee for a goalkeeper and the sale of Phil Babb also to Liverpool in 1994 set a British record transfer fee for a defender. 

Progression of record fee received

Managerial records

References

External links
 Coventry City on the box - links to various match videos

English football club statistics
Records and Statistics
Coventry-related lists